Los Blázquez is a town  in the province of Córdoba, Spain. ,  it had  a  population of 738 inhabitants. During the Spanish Civil War in 1938, Los Blazquez placed a key role.

References

External links
Los Blázquez - Sistema de Información Multiterritorial de Andalucía

Municipalities in the Province of Córdoba (Spain)